The periotic bone is the single bone that surrounds the inner ear of mammals. It is formed from the fusion of the prootic, epiotic, and opisthotic bones.

References

External links 
 http://www.encyclopedia.com/doc/1O8-perioticbone.html

Skeletal system
Mammal anatomy